The 2019–20 Hellenic Football League season was the 67th in the history of the Hellenic Football League, a football competition in England.

The allocations for Steps 1 to 6 for season 2019–20 were announced by the FA on 19 May 2019. These were subject to appeal, and the Hellenic's constitution was ratified at the league's AGM in June.

As a result of the COVID-19 pandemic, this season's competition was formally abandoned on 26 March 2020, with all results from the season being expunged, and no promotion or relegation taking place to, from, or within the competition. On 30 March 2020, sixty-six non-league clubs sent an open letter to the Football Association requesting that they reconsider their decision.

Premier Division

The Premier Division featured 16 clubs which competed in the division last season, along with three new clubs:
 Burnham, promoted from Division One East
 Easington Sports, promoted from Division One West
 Westfields, transferred from the Midland League

Chipping Sodbury Town were initially transferred from the Western League to the Hellenic League, however this was reversed on appeal on 11 June.

League table

Results table

Division One East

Division One East featured eleven clubs which competed in the division last season, along with six new clubs:
 Abingdon United, relegated from the Premier Division
 Kidlington development, transferred from Division One West
 Langley, promoted from Division Two East
 Long Crendon, promoted from Division Two East
 Marlow United, promoted from the Thames Valley Premier League
 Risborough Rangers, transferred from the Spartan South Midlands League

League table

Results table

Division One West

Division One West featured eight clubs which competed in the division last season, along with eight new clubs.
Clubs, transferred from the West Midlands (Regional) League:
Hereford Lads Club
Malvern Town
Pegasus Juniors, changed its name to Hereford Pegasus
Wellington
Clubs, promoted from Division Two West:
Bourton Rovers
Moreton Rangers
Plus:
Shortwood United, relegated from the Western League Premier Division
Stonehouse Town, promoted from the Gloucestershire County Football League

League table

Results table

Division Two North

Division Two North featured 14 new clubs:
Adderbury Park, transferred from Division Two West
Headington Amateurs, transferred from Division Two West
Woodstock Town, transferred from Division Two West
Risborough Rangers reserves, transferred from Division Two East
Old Bradwell United development, transferred from Division Two East
Chinnor, relegated from Division One East
Milton United development
Banbury United development
Buckingham Athletic development
Easington Sports development
Heyford Athletic, joined from the Oxfordshire Senior League
Long Crendon reserves, joined from the Oxfordshire Senior League
Moreton Rangers reserves
Southam United

League table

Division Two South

Division Two South featured 14 new clubs:
Abingdon United development, transferred from Division Two West
Penn & Tylers Green reserves, transferred from Division Two East
Yateley United, transferred from Division Two East
Stokenchurch, transferred from Division Two East
Virginia Water reserves, transferred from Division Two East
Chalfont Wasps, transferred from Division Two East
Chalvey Sports reserves, transferred from Division Two East
Taplow United, transferred from Division Two East
Wallingford Town reserves, transferred from Division Two East
Aston Clinton development, transferred from Division Two East
Wokingham & Emmbrook reserves, joined from the Thames Valley Premier Football League
Hazlemere Sports
AFC Aldermaston reserves
Langley development

League table

Division Two West

Division Two West featured 7 clubs which competed in the division last season, along with 6 new clubs:
Chippenham Town development
Fairford Town reserves
Kintbury Rangers reserves
Letcombe, joined from the North Berks League
Shortwood United development
Swindon Robins

League table

References

External links
 Official Site

2019–20
9
Association football events curtailed and voided due to the COVID-19 pandemic